Lari Arthur Ketner (February 1, 1977 – October 10, 2014) was an American professional basketball player. A ,  forward/center, Ketner played college basketball at the University of Massachusetts Amherst, and was selected by the Chicago Bulls with the 49th overall pick (second round) of the 1999 NBA draft.

Career

Ketner played in two National Basketball Association (NBA) seasons for three teams: Chicago Bulls (1999-2000), Cleveland Cavaliers (1999–2000) and Indiana Pacers (2000-01). He averaged 1.4 points, 1.4 rebounds, and 0.1 assists. After his brief NBA career, Lari tried a few minor league basketball teams. He played in the Continental Basketball Association (CBA) for the Fort Wayne Fury and Idaho Stampede. On January 1, 2005 while standing outside of a nightclub talking to associates, Lari was shot eight times by an unknown person, ultimately ending his basketball career. Lari later followed his passion of working with disadvantaged children by working at several group homes in his hometown of Philadelphia.

Personal life
On August 28, 2013, at 36 years old, Ketner was diagnosed with Stage IV colon cancer. After being diagnosed with cancer, Ketner completed the three courses needed to receive his bachelor's degree from University of Massachusetts Amherst. He completed his final course in August 2014 and received his degree. Lari was married to Aquarius Ketner and was the father of three children and stepfather of two. He resided in Indianapolis, Indiana. He died on October 10, 2014, in Avon, Indiana, from colon cancer at age 37.

References

External links
 Profile, basketball-reference.com
 Profile, UMassHoops.com 
 Profile, NBA.com
 Profile, sportsillustrated.cnn.com

1977 births
2014 deaths
American men's basketball players
Basketball players from Philadelphia
Centers (basketball)
Chicago Bulls draft picks
Chicago Bulls players
Cleveland Cavaliers players
Deaths from cancer in Indiana
Deaths from colorectal cancer
Fort Wayne Fury players
Idaho Stampede (CBA) players
Indiana Pacers players
Power forwards (basketball)
UMass Minutemen basketball players